The Lexicon Recentis Latinitatis is a New Latin dictionary published by the Vatican-based Latinitas Foundation. 
The book is an attempt to update the Latin language with a definition of neologisms in Latin.

External links 

 Latinitas Foundation
 Excerpt (in Italian)

Latin dictionaries
20th-century Latin books